Brooklyn Community Board 4 is a New York City community board that encompasses the Brooklyn neighborhood of Bushwick.  It is delimited by Broadway on the west, Flushing Avenue on the north, the Queens Borough line and Vermont Avenue on the east, as well as by Highland Avenue on the south.

Its current Chairperson is Robert Camacho, and the District Manager is Celestina León. Born and raised in the Bushwick Community, Robert Camacho has been an advocate in the Bushwick Community for almost 30 years.    

As of the United States Census, 2000, the Community Board has a population of 104,358, up from 102,572 in 1990 and 92,497 in 1980. 
Of them (as of 2000), 3,026 (2.9%) are White non Hispanic, 24,838 (23.8%) are African-American, 3,245 (3.1%) Asian or Pacific Islander, 300 (0.3%) American Indian or Native Alaskan, 787 (0.8%) of some other race, 2,020 (1.9%) of two or more race, 70,142 (67.2%) of Hispanic origins.
51.9% of the population benefit from public assistance as of 2004, up from 36.6% in 2000.

References

External links
Official site of the Community Board
Brooklyn neighborhood map

Community boards of Brooklyn
Bushwick, Brooklyn